

This is a list of the National Register of Historic Places listings in Adams County, Illinois.

This is intended to be a complete list of the properties and districts on the National Register of Historic Places in Adams County, Illinois, United States. Latitude and longitude coordinates are provided for many National Register properties and districts; these locations may be seen together in a map.

There are 27 properties and districts listed on the National Register in the county.

Current listings

|}

See also

List of National Historic Landmarks in Illinois
National Register of Historic Places listings in Illinois
List of attractions in Quincy, Illinois

References

 
Adams